Mike Bolsenbroek (born March 11, 1987) is a Dutch professional baseball pitcher.

Career
He played in the Philadelphia Phillies minor league system from 2008-2010 and was a member of the Netherlands national baseball team for the 2017 World Baseball Classic. He played for Team Netherlands in the 2019 European Baseball Championship, and competed for it at the Africa/Europe 2020 Olympic Qualification tournament, in Italy in September 2019.

References

External links

1987 births
2016 European Baseball Championship players
2017 World Baseball Classic players
2019 European Baseball Championship players
2023 World Baseball Classic players
Dutch expatriate baseball players in the United States
Florida Complex League Phillies players
Lakewood BlueClaws players
Living people
Mr. Cocker HCAW players
Williamsport Crosscutters players
Dutch expatriate baseball players in Australia
Brisbane Bandits players